Tonje Enkerud (born 21 August 1994) is a Norwegian handball player for Viborg HK  and the Norwegian national team.

She also represented Norway in the 2013 Women's Junior European Handball Championship, placing 4th, and in the 2014 Women's Junior World Handball Championship, placing 9th.

Achievements
World Youth Championship:
Bronze Medalist: 2012
Youth European Championship:
Bronze Medalist: 2011
Norwegian League
Silver Medalist: 2018/2019, 2019/2020, 2020/2021
Bronze Medalist: 2017/2018
Norwegian Cup:
Finalist: 2018, 2019

References

1994 births
Living people
Norwegian female handball players